Tender Heart High School, Chandigarh  established in 1973, is an educational institution run by Atma Vishwas Instructional Society (Regd.), Chandigarh. It is affiliated to the ICSE Council, New Delhi. Tender Heart School was allotted land by the Chandigarh Administration and has its campus located in Sector 33-B Chandigarh.

References

High schools and secondary schools in Chandigarh